Richard Robert Caples (December 23, 1921 – April 28, 2002) was an American politician who served as Massachusetts public safety commissioner.

Early life
Caples was born on December 23, 1921 in Boston. He attended the Brighton High School, Princeton University, and the Boston University School of Law. He served in the United States Navy during World War II and was a member of the Naval Reserve for 27 years.

Political career
Caples was a member of the Massachusetts House of Representatives from 1951 to 1959 and the Massachusetts Senate from 1959 to 1963. He then served as a legislative aide to Massachusetts Governor Endicott Peabody.

Public safety Commissioner
Peabody lost his reelection bid in 1964 and spent his final days appointing aides to government positions. Peabody had until December 31 to legally make an appointment that could not be recalled by his successor, but due to Christmas break, this deadline was pushed to midnight on December 23. Men who held Caples position were usually appointed to judgeships, however there were no vacancies available. On December 22, it was announced that public safety commissioner Robert W. MacDonald had resigned and Caples would succeed him. Caples and his family arrived at the Governor's office for his swearing in, however, MacDonald showed up and announced that he never intended to resign. MacDonald's wife, however, convinced her husband to return to his law practice and at 11:35 pm on December 22, Caples was sworn in.

Caples appointment was to fill the unexpired term of Frank S. Giles, who had been suspended since his indictment on charges of conspiracy, larceny, aiding and abetting in making false reports, and conflict of interest. However, Giles resigned on September 27, 1965 and Governor John A. Volpe appointed Leo L. Laughlin to succeed him. Caples claimed that he could not legally be replaced until the expiration of Giles' term on July 20, 1966 and refused to give up his office. Laughlin instead took a temporary office in the agency's headquarters while Caples pursued legal action. On September 30, 1965, Suffolk County Superior Court Judge Harry T. Kalus refused to issue an injunction to prevent the Secretary of the Commonwealth from issuing Laughlin's commission and Laughlin moved into the commissioner's office. Kalus later ruled that Laughlin was "the legally and duly qualified Commissioner of Public Safety". His decision was affirmed by the Massachusetts Supreme Judicial Court.

Later career
Caples practiced law in Boston for many years and during the 1970s also served as an assistant attorney general under Robert H. Quinn. He later retired to Wolfeboro, New Hampshire, where he worked as a real estate broker.

Caples died on April 28, 2002 in Lebanon, New Hampshire.

See also
 1951–1952 Massachusetts legislature
 1953–1954 Massachusetts legislature
 1955–1956 Massachusetts legislature

References

1921 births
2002 deaths
20th-century American politicians
United States Navy personnel of World War II
Boston University School of Law alumni
Princeton University alumni
Massachusetts lawyers
Democratic Party Massachusetts state senators
Democratic Party members of the Massachusetts House of Representatives
People from Boston
People from Wolfeboro, New Hampshire
United States Navy reservists
Military personnel from Massachusetts
20th-century American lawyers